The Elcesaites, Elkasaites, Elkesaites or Elchasaites were an ancient Jewish Christian sect in Lower Mesopotamia, then the province of Asoristan in the Sasanian Empire that was active between 100 and 400 CE. The members of this sect, which originated in the Transjordan, performed frequent baptisms for purification and had a Gnostic orientation.

The name of the sect derives from the alleged founder, Elkhasaí ( in Hippolytus), Elksai ( in Epiphanius), or Elkesai ( in Eusebius, and Theodoret).

Patristic testimony
The sect is directly mentioned only in the commentaries on "heresies" by Early Church Fathers.

Hippolytus
Hippolytus of Rome (Refutation of All Heresies, IX, 8–13) records that in the time of Pope Callixtus I (217–222 AD), a Jewish Christian called Alcibiades of Apamea came to Rome, bringing a book which he said had been received in Parthia by a just man named Elchasai. This giant angel was the Son of God, who was accompanied by his sister, the Holy Ghost, of the same dimensions. Alcibiades announced that a new remission of sins had been proclaimed in the third year of Trajan (100 AD), and he described a baptism which should impart this forgiveness even to the grossest sinners.

Hippolytus' commentary starts in book 9, chapter 8. In his next section, Hippolytus recounts that Alcibiades teaches the natural birth, preexistence and reincarnation of Jesus, which Louis Ginzberg suggested in 1906 may relate to the concept of Adam Kadmon, and also that Alcibiades teaches circumcision and the Law of Moses. Hippolytus then goes on at length to describe the group's teaching on baptism. For all sins of impurity, even against nature, a second baptism is enjoined "in the name of the great and most high God and in the name of His Son the great King", with an adjuration of the seven witnesses written in the book (sky, water, the holy spirits, the angels of prayer, oil, salt and earth). One who has been bitten by a mad dog is to run to the nearest water and jump in with all his clothes on, using the foregoing formula, and promising the seven witnesses that he will abstain from sin. The same treatment – forty days consecutively of baptism in cold water – is recommended for consumption and for the possessed. In his chapter 11, Hippolytus discusses in more detail the teaching of the book including Elchasai's Sabbatarian teaching and the instruction not to baptise under certain astrological stars. Hippolytus concludes his review of the Elcesaites in Refutations, book 10, chapter 12 with a general exhortation to avoid heresy which gives away no more information.

Adolf von Harnack (1898) reads "was proclaimed" instead of "has been proclaimed" (as if  and not ), and thus inferred that a special year of remission is spoken of as past once for all – and that Alcibiades had no reason for inventing this, so that Adolf Bernhard Christoph Hilgenfeld (1884) was right in holding that Elchasai really lived under Trajan, as Epiphanius of Salamis supposed.

Eusebius
Eusebius (History 6.38) records a summary of a sermon on Psalm 82 delivered in Caesarea by Origen  AD which warns his audience against the doctrine of "the Elkesaites". Eusebius' record of this sermon forms the second source on the group. According to Eusebius, Origen regarded the heresy as quite new, and states that the group deny the writings of Paul, but claim to have received a new book from heaven.

Epiphanius (c. 310/20 – 403)
A century and a half later, Epiphanius of Salamis found it in use among the Sampsæans, descendants of the earlier Elcesaites, and also among the Essenes and many other Ebionite communities. We learn further from Epiphanius that the book condemned virginity and continence and made marriage obligatory. It permitted the worship of cult images to escape persecution, provided the act was merely an external one, disavowed in the heart. Prayer was to be made not to the East, but always towards Jerusalem.

Yet all animal sacrifice was condemned, with a denial that it had been offered by the Patriarchs or in the Torah. The Prophets as well as the Christian Apostles were rejected, and of course Paul the Apostle and all his writings.

Epiphanius mentions as Elkesai's brother a man called Jekseos ( in Hæreses, xix. 1), and explains the brother's name as being derived from the Hebrew for "hidden power" and Elkesai as "the hidden God." Epiphanius records that the saints of the Elcesaites were two women: Martha ("mistress") and Marthana ("our mistress").

According to Joseph Lightfoot, the Church Father Epiphanius (writing in the 4th century CE) seems to make a distinction between two main groups within the Essenes: "Of those that came before his [Elxai (Elkesai), an Ossaean prophet] time and during it, the Ossaeans and the Nasaraeans."Part 19 Epiphanius describes the Ossaeans as following:

Other sources
The Cologne Mani-Codex (dated from the fourth century) describes the parents of Mani, founder of Manichaeism, as "followers of the prophet Alchasaios", which scholars have identified with Elchasai. Alchasaios is stated to be a prophet also honoured by Mani. His name appears in several other sources on Manichaeism, but in so altered a form that the identification with Elchasai was clear only with the publication of the Cologne codex.

The Codex deals with the Elcesaites extensively, confirms some of the Church Fathers’ statements about them, and depicts Mani as a 'reformer' with the purpose to 'restore' the true doctrine of prophet Alchasaios, which his followers had 'misunderstood'. In particular, Mani criticises their repeated baptism rituals.

The Elcesaites may be mentioned in a Persepolis inscription from the third century, with a sect name mktk- from the Iranian root mak-, "to moisten" or "to wash". Much later, in his Fihrist, the Arabic Muslim scholar ibn al-Nadim, c. 987, found Mogtasilah ("washers"), a sect of Sabians in the desert who counted al-Hasih (possibly Arabic for "Elchasai") as their founder.

Scholarly analysis
It has been customary to find Elcasaite doctrine in the Clementine "Homilies" and "Recognitions", especially in the former. The 1911 Catholic Encyclopedia calls this groundless and refers to the article on Clementine literature.

See also
 Origins of Christianity
 Mandaeans

Notes

External links 
 Catholic Encyclopedia: Elcesaites
 Jewish Encyclopedia: Elcesaites
 

 
Heresy in ancient Christianity
Christian denominations established in the 3rd century
Early Jewish Christian sects
Gnosticism
Religion in the Sasanian Empire